Zhang Jin (born 9 May 1972) is a former Chinese badminton player. She was the gold medalists at the 1997 Busan East Asian Games in the women's doubles and team events, also won a silver medal in the mixed doubles.

Achievements

World Cup 
Mixed doubles

Asian Championships 
Women's doubles

Mixed doubles

Asian Cup 
Women's doubles

East Asian Games 
Women's doubles

Mixed doubles

IBF World Grand Prix 
The World Badminton Grand Prix sanctioned by International Badminton Federation (IBF) since 1983.

Women's doubles

Mixed doubles

IBF International 
Women's doubles

References

External links
 

1972 births
Living people
Chinese female badminton players